Gerald C. Olesen is a retired brigadier general in the United States Air National Guard and former Assistant Adjutant General of Wisconsin for the Air.

Career
Olesen originally enlisted in the United States Air Force in 1967. Four years later he transferred to the Wisconsin Air National Guard and was commissioned a second lieutenant in 1978. Olesen was promoted to Brigadier General on October 14, 2006.

Awards he has received include the Meritorious Service Medal with two oak leaf clusters, the Air Force Commendation Medal with two oak leaf clusters, the Air Force Outstanding Unit Award with four oak leaf clusters, the Organizational Excellence Award with oak leaf cluster, the Air Reserve Forces Meritorious Service Medal with oak leaf cluster, the National Defense Service Medal with two service stars, the Global War on Terrorism Service Medal, the Air Force Longevity Service Award with silver oak leaf cluster and two bronze oak leaf clusters, the Armed Forces Reserve Medal with gold hourglass device, the NCO Professional Military Education Graduate Ribbon, the Small Arms Expert Marksmanship Ribbon with service star, and the Air Force Training Ribbon with oak leaf cluster.

Education
Graduate - Air War College
B.S. - Upper Iowa University

References

Year of birth missing (living people)
Living people
Military personnel from Wisconsin
United States Air Force generals
Air University (United States Air Force) alumni
Upper Iowa University alumni